Probe may refer to:

Films
 Probe (film), American TV film that served as the pilot for the TV series Search 
 P.R.O.B.E., direct to video Doctor Who spinoffs featuring Liz Shaw

Television
 Probe (1988 TV series), American TV series created by William Link and Isaac Asimov
 Probe (Philippine TV program), a defunct Philippine public-affairs show
 "The Probe" (Beast Wars), an episode
 "The Probe", the final episode of the original The Outer Limits

Other entertainment
 Probe (parlor game), a parlor game introduced in the 1960s by Parker Brothers
 "Probe", a 2002 hit single by DJ Baby Anne
 One of characters from the BoBoiBoy franchise

Other uses
 Ford Probe, coupe produced by Ford, introduced in 1989
 Probe Records (shop), an independent record shop in Liverpool, England
 Space probe, unmanned spacecraft
 Molecular probe, a group of atoms or molecules used to study other molecules
 Hybridization probe, a labeled fragment of DNA or RNA,
 Test probe (electronics), a physical device used to connect electronic test equipment to a device under test
 Probe, also known as a criminal investigation

See also
 Sonde (disambiguation), French for probe